Benzonsdal is a manor house located at Torslunde, south of Taastrup, in the northern part of Ishøj Municipality, some 20 kilometres west of central Copenhagen, Denmark. It has been owned by members of the noble Lerche family since 1853. The main building is from 1856.

History

Benzon family
 
Benzonsdal was established by Supreme Court justice Peder Benzon in 1730 from land that had until then belonged to Gjeddesdal. The aim was to secure a more simple and efficient management of the land. Benzon was a major landowner who also established the manors of Benzonseje (now Risbyholm), Dønnerup and Gislingegård. He had previously been the owner of Hagestedgaard and Alslevgård. The new manor comprised 50 tenant farms, 100 smallholdings, a brickyard and four watermills.

One of Peder Benzon's brother, Lars Benzon, bought Benzonsdal from the heirs after Peder Benzon's death in 1735. In 1740, he sold the estate to a third brother,  Jacob Benzon.

Changing owners, 1744-1853
 
In 1757, Benzonsdal was acquired Frederik Barfred. He wanted to ensure that the estate would stay in the family and therefore created a so-called stamhus in 1765 with the effect that it could neither be sold, margaged or divided between heirs. Stamhuset Benzonsdal was, however, already dissolved in 1786 and the estate was then sold to his son Jens Laurits Barfred. In 1797, he also purchased Gjeddesdal. In the 1780s, Barfred implemented the tenant farms off to the farmers in accordance with the agricultural reforms of the time. In 1800, he sold the rest of the estate to Niels de Bang and Christian Ulrich Detlev von Eggers. Niels de Bang, who after a while had become the sole owner of Benzonsdal, made a big effort to assist the sick and poor farmers on his estate during an outbreak of dysentery.

1853-present: The Lerche family
 
Count Carl Christian Cornelius Lerche bought Benzonsdal in 1853 and constructed a new main building in 1856.

Architecture
The main building is from 1856. It consists of two storeys over a high cellar. It is built in yellow brick and has a slate roof..

Estate
The house is located in the middle of a scenic garden. A tree-lined avenue leads up to the house.

The estate covers 447 hectares of which 38 hectares have been leased. 409 hectares are farmland.

Cultural references
In the late 1960s, Benzonsdal has been used as a location in two Danish adaptions of The Famous Five novels, De fem og spionerne (1969) and De fem i fedtefadet (1970). It was also used as a location in Thomas Vinterberg's 2013 drama film The Hunt.

List of owners
 (1730-1735) Peder Benzon
 (1735-1740) Lars Benzon
 (1740-1744) Jacob Benzon
 (1744-1757) Jens Andresen
 (1757-1786) Frederik Barfred
 (1786-1800) Jens Lauritz Barfred
 (1800-    ) Chr. Ulrich Detlev von Eggers
 (1800-1806) Niels de Bang
 (1806-1807) Peder Bech
 (1807-1853) Frederik Mathias Barfred
 (1853-1881) Carl Chr. Cornelius Lerche
 (1881-1890) Sophie Frederikke Steensen, gift Lerche
 (1890-1918) Carl Chr. Baron Lerche
 (1918-1944) Carl Chr. Cornelius Lerche
 (1918- 1966) Vincens Chr.  Lerche
 (1966-1998) Carl Chr. Frederik Lerche
 (1991-2012) Vincens Carl Chr. Lerche
 (2012-present) Chr. Cornelius Lerche

References

External links

 Official website
 Source
 Source

Buildings and structures in Ishøj Municipality
Buildings and structures associated with the Lerche family
Buildings and structures associated with the Benzon family
Houses completed in 1856